The Upper Hunter Shire is a local government area in the Upper Hunter Region of New South Wales, Australia. The Shire was formed in May 2004 from the Scone Shire and parts of Murrurundi and Merriwa shires.

The Mayor of the Upper Hunter Shire Council is Cr. Maurice Collison, following the sudden resignation of Wayne Bedggood as Mayor and as a Councillor on 9 June 2020. No reason has been given for the sudden resignation.

Council's General Manager is Greg McDonald

Towns
The towns of the Upper Hunter are Scone, Parkville, Aberdeen, Murrurundi, and Merriwa, as well as several villages, including Bunnan, Gundy, Moonan Flat, Ellerston, Wingen, Blandford and Cassilis. Of the towns, only Aberdeen on the Shire's southeastern border is situated on the Hunter River.

Heritage listings
The Upper Hunter Shire has a number of heritage-listed sites, including:
 Ardglen, Main Northern railway: Ardglen Tunnel
 Merriwa, Bow Street: Colonial Cottage Museum
 Murrurundi, Main Northern railway: Murrurundi railway station
 Murrurundi, Mount Street: Rosedale Cottage
 Scone, 144 Kelly Street: Scone Civic TheatreScone, New South Wales
 Scone, 41 Kingdon Road: Old Court Theatre
 Scone, Main Northern railway: Scone railway station
 Wingen, Raglan Street: Mountain House, Wingen

Demographics
Aboriginal and Torres Strait Islander people made up 3.9 percent of the population, which was higher than the national and state averages of 2.5 percent. The median age of people in the Upper Hunter Shire was 39 years, which was marginally higher than the national median of 37 years. Children aged 0 – 14 years made up 21.2 percent of the population and people aged 65 years and over made up 16.4 percent of the population. Of people in the area aged 15 years and over, 51.6 per cent were married and 11.6 per cent were either divorced or separated.

When compared with the total population growth of Australia for the same period, at 8.32 percent, population growth in the Upper Hunter Shire local government area was slightly lower than the national average. The median weekly income for residents within the Upper Hunter Shire was marginally lower than the national average.

At the 2011 census, the proportion of residents in the Upper Hunter Shire local government area who stated their ancestry as Australian or Anglo-Saxon exceeded 85 percent of all residents (national average was 65.2 percent). In excess of 75% of all residents in the Upper Hunter Shire nominated a religious affiliation with Christianity at the 2011 census, which was considerably higher than the national average of 50.2 percent. Meanwhile, as at the census date, compared to the national average, households in the Upper Hunter Shire local government area had a significantly lower than average proportion (3.1 percent) where two or more languages are spoken (national average was 20.4 percent); and a significantly higher proportion (93.9 percent) where English only was spoken at home (national average was 76.8 percent).

Council

Current composition and election method
Upper Hunter Shire Council is composed of nine Councillors elected proportionally as a single ward. All Councillors are elected for a fixed four-year term of office. The Mayor is elected by the Councillors at the first meeting of the council. The most recent election was held on 10 September 2016 and the makeup of the council is as follows:

At the 2016 election, there were 10,094 people enrolled to vote in the local government area. The current Council, elected in 2016, in order of election, is:

Attractions
The Upper Hunter is the largest horse-rearing region in Australia.

The Burning Mountain Nature Reserve, near Wingen, is the site of a subterranean coal seam fire that has been burning for several thousand years.

The council also owns several FM rebroadcasters of ABC Radio National and SBS Radio, under the self-help schemes run by those broadcasters.

References

External links
 http://www.upperhunter.nsw.gov.au/